The thirty-fourth government of Israel, also known as the Fourth Netanyahu Government, was the government of Israel, headed by Prime Minister Benjamin Netanyahu between 2015 and 2020. It was formed after the March 2015 Knesset election. The coalition that made up the government, consisting of Likud, United Torah Judaism, Shas, Kulanu and the Jewish Home, was submitted to the President of Israel just before the deadline on 6 May 2015. Government ministers were introduced, approved by the Knesset and sworn in on 14 May. Deputy ministers were sworn in on 19 May. On 29 December 2018, the newly-formed New Right party became a coalition partner, after splitting from the Jewish Home.

Between them, the coalition parties held 61 of the 120 seats in the Knesset. The elections that led to the formation of the government were a result of events on 2 December 2014, when Netanyahu dismissed two of his ministers, whose parties' members subsequently resigned from the 33rd government, dissolving the government ahead of schedule.

During the 34th government, several corruption cases arose in regards to Netanyahu. Justice Minister Ayelet Shaked stated that even if indicted, Netanyahu would still be able to continue as Prime Minister. On 26 December 2018, Knesset members officially passed a law dispersing the Knesset. The Knesset reassembled following the April 2019 Israeli legislative election, only to be dispersed once again on 30 May 2019 after Netanyahu failed to form a new cabinet.

Policy guidelines
The policy guidelines for the 34th government included, but were not limited to:
Strengthening the rule of law
Reducing the cost of living
Increasing competition, especially in the financial sector, and granting easier access to credit for small and medium businesses
Integrating disabled persons into society, in providing education and employment aid
Advancing the peace process with the Palestinians and other neighbors, while keeping Israel's national interests

Recommendations

Terms of coalition agreements are considered binding law in Israel. As such, parties must adhere to the agreements made with the Prime Minister when the coalition was formed.

Changes to the responsibilities of official positions include the relinquishment of the Justice Minister's ability to appoint judges to religious courts. Also, the Religious Affairs Minister will not have control over affairs connected to conversion to Judaism; that will be under the purview of the Prime Minister's office.

Coalition agreements

Kulanu
Kulanu agreed to support the implementation of the Norwegian Law, allowing members of the Knesset to exit the Knesset upon receiving a post in the cabinet.

Likud agreed to raise the salary of soldiers, give unemployment insurance to self-employed workers and set a biennial budget by October 2015.

Kulanu was also permitted to vote against the coalition if it disagreed with legislation that would reform the Israeli Supreme Court.

The Jewish Home
The agreement included an increase of NIS 630 million ($163.4 million) for the education budget, an allocation of NIS 1 billion ($259 million) to raise soldiers' pay during their third year of service, a budget increase for Ariel University, which is in the West Bank, and support for the so-called NGO bill.

The agreement also stipulated that all obligations and commitments made to increase Haredi institutions will have to come from the Finance Ministry, not the Education Ministry.

Cabinet members
On 30 May 2019, Netanyahu failed to form a new cabinet following disputes with former Defense Minister Avigdor Lieberman and a vote to temporarily dissolve the Knesset until another election can be held in September 2019 was passed. The current Cabinet, which is inactive in its full duties so long as the Knesset is dissolved, includes:

Deri resigned his post as Minister of the Economy, reportedly over an unpopular gas monopoly deal. Netanyahu took over the portfolio, and promised to speed up the deal. Netanyahu resigned his post as Minister of Communications following an investigation into his relationship with the media, and was replaced temporarily by Tzachi Hanegbi. The Ministry for Senior Citizens was renamed Ministry for Social Equality in August, 2015.

Deputy ministers

Security cabinet

Committee chairs

Government agencies and special committees

References

External links

Thirty-fourth government of Israel at the Knesset website
Thirty-fourth government of Israel at the Israel Ministry of Foreign Affairs website
Thirty-fourth government of Israel at the Jewish Virtual Library website

 34
2015 establishments in Israel
2020 disestablishments in Israel
Cabinets established in 2015
Cabinets disestablished in 2020
2015 in Israeli politics
2016 in Israeli politics
2017 in Israeli politics
2018 in Israeli politics
2019 in Israeli politics
2020 in Israeli politics
 34
 34
20th Knesset (2015–2019)
21st Knesset (2019)
22nd Knesset (2019–2020)
+34